Love and Thunder is the fourth album by the American singer-songwriter Andrew Peterson, released in 2003.

Background
Peterson worked with Steve Hindalong, Derri Daugherty, in the production of this album. Essential Records released the album on February 25, 2003.

Musical style
Reviewing the album for CCM Magazine, Andy Argyrakis recognizes, "Since his debut in 2000, Andrew Peterson has become a treasured singer/songwriter whose textured folk stylings and delicate acoustics allow his storybook lyrics to come alive...Throughout such cuts and the six others, you’ll find a supplementary smattering of placid acoustics, frolicking folk, bits of banjo-driven bluegrass and even some subtle strings, furthering the classic mood you’ve come to expect from this troubadour."

Critical reception

Awarding the album four and a half stars at Christianity Today, Russ Breimeier writes, "Give Love & Thunder your undivided attention for a truly rewarding Christian music experience." Tony Cummings, rating the album a nine out of ten for Cross Rhythms, says, " Pop radio it isn’t but magnificent it is." Giving the album a four out of five from The Phantom Tollbooth, Brian A. Smith states, "This album is superior to Peterson's previous works and shows a developing maturity as a writer."

Ashleigh Kittle, indicating in a three star review by AllMusic, replies, "The album continues in Peterson's acoustic folk style, resembling both the work and the melancholy feel of Rich Mullins and Fernando Ortega." Signaling in a three out of five review at The Phantom Tollbooth, Matt Kilgore responds, "Peterson proves at several point in Love and Thunder that he still has some of the amazing songwriting ability which he has always had, but not as great as we have seen it."

Track listing

References

2003 albums
Andrew Peterson (musician) albums
Essential Records (Christian) albums